Oleksandr Korchmid (born 22 January 1982) is a Ukrainian pole vaulter.

As a junior, he won silver medals at the 1999 World Youth Championships and the 2000 World Junior Championships. He was also a gold medalist at the 2003 Summer Universiade and a bronze medalist at the 2005 Summer Universiade. He also competed in the 2004 Olympic Games, but came last in the pole vault final. He finished sixth in the pole vault final at the 2006 European Athletics Championships and fourth at the 2007 European Athletics Indoor Championships. He then competed at the 2007 World Championships and the 2008 Olympic Games without reaching the final.

His personal best jump is 5.81 metres, achieved in August 2005 in Rovereto.

In 2009 he was found guilty of ephedrine doping. The sample was delivered on 15 February 2009 in an in-competition test in Donetsk. He did not receive a suspension, rather a public warning.

References

1982 births
Living people
Ukrainian male pole vaulters
Athletes (track and field) at the 2004 Summer Olympics
Athletes (track and field) at the 2008 Summer Olympics
Olympic athletes of Ukraine
Doping cases in athletics
Ukrainian sportspeople in doping cases
Universiade medalists in athletics (track and field)
Universiade gold medalists for Ukraine
Universiade bronze medalists for Ukraine